The Erotic Heritage Museum (EHM) is a  space with  dedicated to the history of erotica, located in Las Vegas. The grand patron of the museum is Harry Mohney, founder of Déjà Vu. An educational, performance and exhibit space, The Erotic Heritage Museum also houses a lobby selling various retail items and hosts readings, symposiums and 'meet and greets' of notables in the world of sexual education and art.

History
The museum opened on August 2, 2008, ceased operations for a brief restructuring on February 19, 2014, and reopened on June 7, 2014, as Harry Mohney's Erotica Museum. The museum is managed by Harry Mohney Erotic Museum LLC, a Nevada corporation.

Collection
The Harry Mohney Erotic Museum's sole purpose is to perform educational, scientific and literary functions relating to sexual, emotional, mental and physical health. Historical and contemporary erotic materials donated to the Harry Mohney Erotic Museum may be sold by the artist or collection holder, or made available on loan from individual artists for viewing in accordance with federal law.

The museum seeks to bridge the gap between that which is commercial and often misidentified as pornographic, with that which is aesthetic, often identified as folk, pop, and fine art. In keeping with the legacy of the American sexual revolution, the EHM is dedicated to the belief that sexual pleasure and fun are natural aspects of the human experience, that such pleasure should be made available to all, and that our individual sexuality belongs to each of us.

The Erotic Heritage Museum features the following displays: 

The Garden of Earthly Delights
Academic reviews of Human Sexuality Studies
Erotically themed photographs, sketches, paintings
Wall of Shame: Articles about Political, Religious or Celebrity Personalities Connected to Scandals
Jay Losofsky Sculptures
The Jewel Box Theater
The Paris Theater
Sex Work in Nevada Exhibit featuring Chicken Ranch artifacts
The Sex in the Future Exhibit featuring an AI Robot
The Star Wars Exhibit
Sex in Space Immersive Exhibit
The Evolution of Human Sexuality Exhibit
The Mel Gordon Horizontal Collaboration Exhibit
Legba and the Fon People of Benin Africa Exhibit
Sex and the Media Video Room Exhibit
The Sex in the Third Reich Exhibit
The Teacher Scandals Exhibit
The History of the Peep Show Exhibit
The LGBTIQ Gallery
The Fithian Collection 
Historic artifacts
Porcelain figurines
Erotic Sculptures
Artist of the Month Gallery
Rotating Exhibits

The second floor is mainly devoted to erotic art, some of it available for sale. The presented pieces range from classic to abstract and include paintings, sketches, watercolors, porcelain figurines, sculptures, and carved wood objects.

References

External links

History museums in Nevada
Sex museums in the United States
Museums in the Las Vegas Valley